The 1856 United States presidential election in Louisiana took place on November 4, 1856, as part of the 1856 United States presidential election. Voters chose six representatives, or electors to the Electoral College, who voted for president and vice president.

Louisiana voted for the Democratic candidate, James Buchanan, over American Party candidate Millard Fillmore. Buchanan won Louisiana by a narrow margin of 3.40%.

Republican Party candidate John C. Frémont was not on the ballot in the state.

Results

See also
 United States presidential elections in Louisiana

References

Louisiana
1856
1856 Louisiana elections